Cuhureștii de Sus is a commune in Floreşti District, Moldova. It is composed of four villages: Cuhureștii de Sus, Nicolaevca, Unchitești and Unchitești station.

References

Communes of Florești District